The Hill 'n' Dale Stakes is a Thoroughbred horse race run annually since 2004 at Woodbine Racetrack in Toronto, Ontario, Canada. Held in mid June, the ungraded stakes race is open to fillies & mares, age three and older. It is raced over a distance of  miles on Polytrack synthetic dirt.

The event currently offers a purse of $100,000 plus her owners receive a choice of three stallion services, courtesy of Hill 'n' Dale Farms in Lexington, Kentucky owned by Canadian John G. Sikura. The race winner gets first choice, then the runner-up chooses from the remaining two, leaving the final stallion's services for the third-place finisher.

This race appears to be discontinued as of 2010.

Records
Speed  record: 
 1:43.63 My Lordship (2004)

Most wins:
 No horse has won this race more than once.

Most wins by an owner:
 2 - Live Oak Plantation (2004, 2005)

Most wins by a jockey:
 3 - Todd Kabel (2004, 2005, 2006)

Most wins by a trainer:
 2 - Malcolm Pierce  (2004, 2005)

Winners of the Hill 'n' Dale Stakes

References
 The Hill 'n' Dale Stakes at Pedigree Query

Ungraded stakes races in Canada
Mile category horse races for fillies and mares
Recurring events established in 2004
Woodbine Racetrack